Hägersten (Heronstone) is an urban district of Stockholm. It is located in the borough of Hägersten-Liljeholmen, which was formed 1 January 2007 by merging the former boroughs of Hägersten and Liljeholmen.

References

Districts of Stockholm